Reacher may refer to:

Arts and entertainment
 Jack Reacher, a fictional character created by Lee Child
 Reacher (TV series), a 2022 television series based on the character

Technology
 Reacher (sailing), a type of boat sail
 Reach extender, a mechanical tool
 Reacher Satellite Ground Terminal, a British military satcom device

See also
 Jack Reacher (disambiguation)
 Reach (disambiguation)